Diego Díaz Garrido (born 30 December 1968), known simply as Diego, is a Spanish retired footballer who played as a goalkeeper.

Club career
Mainly a backup throughout his entire professional career, Madrid-born Diego played mainly for Atlético Madrid. During his late years, he managed to maintain an interesting battle for first-choice with veteran Abel Resino but never really broke into the first team, with his main club or any other.

In January 1991, Diego served a six-month loan at Sporting de Gijón as replacement for Juan Carlos Ablanedo, severely injured. Over the course of seven seasons, he appeared in a total of 61 La Liga games.

Honours
Atlético Madrileño
Segunda División B: 1988–89

Atlético Madrid
Copa del Rey: 1991–92

References

External links

1968 births
Living people
Footballers from Madrid
Spanish footballers
Association football goalkeepers
La Liga players
Segunda División players
Segunda División B players
Atlético Madrid B players
Atlético Madrid footballers
Sporting de Gijón players
Real Valladolid players
Xerez CD footballers
CD Toledo players
RSD Alcalá players
Spain youth international footballers
Spain under-21 international footballers